Athrips gansuensis is a moth of the family Gelechiidae. It is found in China (Gansu).

The wingspan is about 18 mm. The forewings are grey with indistinct paired black spots at one-third and two-thirds. The hindwings are light grey. Adults are on wing at the end of July.

Etymology
The species name refers to Gansu Province, the type locality.

References

Moths described in 2009
Athrips
Moths of Asia